Bhandaria Government College ( '), located in Bhandaria, is one of renowned college of southern Bangladesh. It is a university level college where students besides class 12, they can attend into bachelor courses as well.
The college has a hostel for boys just beside the college campus. It has nearly 600 students studying in intermediate level and another 200 are attending in honours courses under National University.

Department 
The college was upgraded to a University College in 2016.

Honours (pass) courses :

1.[Business Management] 

3.[Political Sciences]

5. Business Studies along with Intermediate level on Science, Arts and Commerce.

History
The college was established in 1970 and was declared governmental institution at 1985. n 17 acres of land. The college was nationalized in 1986.

See also
•Brojomohun College

References

 

Universities and colleges in Pirojpur District